is an onsen (hot spring) in Semboku, Akita, Japan.

See also
Onsen

Hot springs of Japan
Landforms of Akita Prefecture
Buildings and structures in Akita Prefecture
Tourist attractions in Akita Prefecture